The Lovers is a 1984 live album by The Legendary Pink Dots.

Track listing

(*) Included on CD releases only - taken from the Curious Guy 12".

Personnel
Edward Ka-Spel - voice, keyboards
The Silverman (Phil Knight) - keyboards
Stret Majest (Barry Gray) - guitar
Roland Calloway - bass guitar
Patrick Q Paganini (Patrick Wright) - violin, piano      
Lady Sunshine (Marylou Busch) - lady voice

Notes
Tracks 1 through 4 recorded live at De Melkweg, Amsterdam, September 9, 1984. Tracks 5 through 8 recorded for VPRO Radio at Vara Studios, Hilversum, 1984.
Initial release by Ding Dong was limited to 2,000 copies. All releases contain different covers.

References

1984 live albums
The Legendary Pink Dots albums